The British Basketball League Cup, often shortened to the BBL Cup, is an annual cup competition for British basketball teams organised by the United Kingdom's top professional league, the British Basketball League. It is one of two peripheral competitions operated by the League during the regular season, with the other being the BBL Trophy. The competition is usually played as a single game knock-out tournament, and is only contested by members of the British Basketball League. The final takes place in early January at the Arena Birmingham in Birmingham.

History
The competition was established in 2003 following the British Basketball League's (BBL) decision to withdraw its members from the annual National Cup tournament after a disagreement regarding import-players merged with its organiser, the English Basketball Association (EBBA). The EBBA had introduced a ruling that teams could field only two work-permit holders and one other non-permit-holding import in National Cup games for the 2003-04 season, which would have severely deprived the BBL teams of their better players. Due to a sponsorship deal with confectionery company Haribo, the new competition was named the Haribo Cup and saw all ten BBL clubs compete in a single game knock-out format. Sheffield Sharks were crowned as the Cup's first victor's after an 83-70 win over Scottish Rocks at Birmingham's National Indoor Arena. Rocks were again finalists, and Runners-up, in the 2005 edition of the Cup which had been rebranded with its current name as the BBL Cup and was won by Brighton Bears, who had been hugely successful in the predecessor competition, the National Cup, in recent years. In 2006, Newcastle Eagles claimed a historic win over London Towers as part of their "clean-sweep" of all four BBL competitions in their quadruple-winning season.

The 2007 edition of the BBL Cup Final was the closest yet and saw Guildford Heat win their first piece of silverware in franchise history, whilst Scottish Rocks finished as Runners-up for the third time in four seasons. The following year saw perhaps the biggest upset in Cup Final history as underdogs Milton Keynes Lions sneaked to a 69-66 victory over favourites Newcastle. It would be the Lions' first Cup win, largely helped by their offence hitting 13 three-pointers. Everton Tigers continued the new winner every year tradition by thrashing Plymouth Raiders with a blow-out score of 103-49 in the 2009 Cup Final. The 54-point gap between the two debutants is the largest winning margin in Cup history.

Due to the intake of expansion franchises, the 2009–10 season saw an expanded First Round featuring 13 teams, the most teams ever competing for the BBL Cup in its history. It was also the first edition to not feature a new Champion as the Sheffield Sharks claimed their second Cup with a close 89-86 victory over Cheshire Jets in the Final. The following season saw Sheffield become the first team to successfully retain the Cup whilst their MVP winning star Steve Dagostino set a new record for the most points scored in a Final, posting 35. However that record only stood for one year as in the 2012 Final, as Newcastle's Charles Smith led his team to a 115-94 victory over Plymouth with an individual points tally of 39. Smith's record is currently still standing, whilst Newcastle also recorded the highest points scored for a team in any BBL final.

Leicester Riders claimed their first Cup title in the 2013 Final, with a close 85-80 victory over previous winners Newcastle Eagles. The Riders were led by MVP Jay Cousinard who posted 17 points for the first-time winners, and although dominating for much of the game, they survived a late Eagles comeback to hold on for the five-point win. Riders retained their title in 2014 with a three-point victory over Eagles again, becoming only the second team to win back-to-back Finals (the first was Sheffield Sharks in 2011).

Format
The competition is a knockout tournament with pairings drawn completely at random – there are no seeds, and a draw takes place after the majority of fixtures have been played in each round. When there are an uneven number of member clubs in the British Basketball League, some pre-selected teams will receive byes into the next round. The Cup final is played at the Arena Birmingham in Birmingham, usually in early January.

Finals

Results by team

See also
Basketball in England
British Basketball League
BBL Trophy

References

External links
BBL Cup on the BBL's official website.

Basketball league cup competitions in Europe
British Basketball League
Basketball cup competitions in the United Kingdom
Sport in Birmingham, West Midlands